St. Eloi Mountain is located on the border of Alberta and British Columbia on the Continental Divide. It was named in 1917 after St. Eloi (Ypres).

Geology

St. Eloi Mountain is composed of sedimentary rock laid down during the Precambrian to Jurassic periods. Formed in shallow seas, this sedimentary rock was pushed east and over the top of younger Cretaceous period rock during the Laramide orogeny.

Climate

Based on the Köppen climate classification, St. Eloi Mountain is located in a subarctic climate zone with cold, snowy winters, and mild summers. Winter temperatures can drop below −20 °C with wind chill factors below −30 °C.

See also
 List of peaks on the Alberta–British Columbia border
 Mountains of Alberta
 Mountains of British Columbia

References

St. Eloi Mountain
St. Eloi Mountain
Canadian Rockies